The 55th Karlovy Vary International Film Festival took place from August 20 to August 28, 2021, in Karlovy Vary, Czech Republic.

A total of 144 films were presented at the festival, including 29 world premieres, twelve international and two European premieres. Serbian-French-Luxembourgish-Bulgarian-Lithuanian co-produced film As Far as I Can Walk won the Crystal Globe. The festival paid tributes to Jan Svěrák and Martin Scorsese's The Film Foundation.

Juries
The following were appointed as the juries at the 55th edition:

Crystal Globe Jury
Eva Mulvad (Denmark)
Marta Nieradkiewicz (Poland)
Christos Nikou (Greece)
Christoph Terhechte (Germany)

FIPRESCI Jury
Birgit Beumers (United Kingdom)
Eirik Bull (Norway)
Adéla Mrázová (Czech Republic)

East of the West
Alise Ģelze (Latvia)
Atanas Georgiev (North Macedonia)
Michal Hogenauer (Czech Republic)
Tonia Mishiali (Cyprus)
Ariel Schweitzer (France)

The Ecumenical Jury
Pierre-Auguste Henry (France)
Angelika Obert (Germany)
Joel Ruml (Czech Republic)

FEDEORA Jury
Natascha Drubek-Meyer (Germany)
Mihai Fulger (Romania)
Nino Kovačić (Croatia)

Europa Cinemas Label Jury
Linda Arbanová (Czech Republic)
Erika Borsos (Hungary)
Gregor Janežič (Slovenia)

Official selection

Crystal Globe

Highlighted title and dagger indicates Crystal Globe winner.
Highlighted title and double-dagger indicates Special Jury Prize winner.

East of the West

Highlighted title and dagger indicates East of the West winner.
Highlighted title and double-dagger indicates East of the West Special Jury Prize winner.

Special Screenings

Horizons
{| class="sortable wikitable" style="width:100%; margin-bottom:4px" cellpadding="5"
|-
!scope="col" | English title
!scope="col" | Original title
!scope="col" | Director(s)
!scope="col" | Production countrie(s)
|-
| Ahed's Knee
| Haderek
| Nadav Lapid
| France, Israel, Germany
|-
| colspan="2"|Ali & Ava
| Clio Barnard
| United Kingdom
|-
| All Eyes Off Me
| Mishehu Yohav Mishehu
| Hadas Ben Aroya
| Israel
|-
| colspan="2"|Amparo
| Simón Mesa Soto
| Colombia, Sweden, Qatar
|-
| colspan="2"|Ananda
| Stefano Deffenu
| Italy
|-
| Apples
| Mila
| Christos Nikou
| Greece, Poland, Slovenia
|-
|colspan="2"| Babi Yar, Context
| Sergei Loznitsa
| Netherlands, Ukraine
|-
| Bad Luck Banging or Loony Porn
| Babardeală cu bucluc sau porno balamuc
| Radu Jude
| Romania, Luxembourg, Czech Republic, Croatia
|-
| Ballad of a White Cow
| Ghasideyeh gave sefid
| Behtash Sanaeeha, Maryam Moghaddam
| Iran, France
|-
| colspan="2"|Benedetta
| Paul Verhoeven
| France, Netherlands
|-
| colspan="2"|Best Sellers
| Lina Roessler
| Canada, United Kingdom
|-
| Between Two Worlds
| Ouistreham
| Emmanuel Carrère
| France
|-
| colspan="2"|A Chiara
| Jonas Carpignano
| Italy, France
|-
| Commitment Hasan
| Bağlılık Hasan
| Semih Kaplanoğlu
| Turkey
|-
| Compartment No. 6
| Hytti nro 6
| Juho Kuosmanen
| Finland, Germany, Estonia, Russia
|-
| Conference
| Konferentsiya
| Ivan I. Tverdovskiy
| Russia, Estonia, United Kingdom, Italy
|-
|colspan="2"| Crock of Gold: A Few Rounds with Shane MacGowan
| Julien Temple
| United Kingdom, Ireland
|-
| The Dawn
| Zora
| Dalibor Matanić
| Croatia
|-
| Drive My Car
| Doraibu mai kâ
| Ryûsuke Hamaguchi
| Japan
|-
| The Employer and the Employee
| El empleado y el patrón
| Manuel Nieto Zas
| Uruguay, Argentina, Brazil, France
|-
| Even Mice Belong in Heaven
| Myši patří do nebe
| Denisa Grimmová, Jan Bubeníček
| Czech Republic, France, Poland, Slovakia
|-
| colspan="2"|Feathers
| Omar El-Zohairy
| France, Egypt, Netherlands, Greece
|-
| colspan="2"|First Reformed
| Paul Schrader
| United States
|-
| colspan="2"|Flee
| Jonas Poher Rasmussen
| Denmark, France, Sweden, Norway
|-
| colspan="2"|The Furnace
| Roderick MacKay
| Australia
|-
| Ghosts
| Hayaletler
| Azra Deniz Okyay
| Turkey, France, Qatar
|-
| colspan="2"|A Glitch in the Matrix
| Rodney Ascher
| United States
|-
| Hit the Road
| Jadde Khaki
| Panah Panahi
| Iran
|-
| Hive
| Zgjoi
| Blerta Basholli
| Kosovo, Switzerland, North Macedonia, Albania
|-
| The House Arrest
| Delo
| Alexey German Jr.
| Russia
|-
| Introduction
| Inteurodeoksyeon
| Hong Sang-soo
| South Korea
|-
| The Intruder
| El prófugo
| Natalia Meta
| Argentina, Mexico
|-
| Lamb
| Dýrið
| Valdimar Jóhannsson
| Iceland, Sweden, Poland
|-
| colspan="2"|Laurent Garnier: Off the Record
| Gabin Rivoire
| United Kingdom, Belgium
|-
| Love Affair(s)
| Les choses qu'on dit, les choses qu'on fait
| Emmanuel Mouret
| France
|-
| colspan="2"|Luzzu
| Alex Camilleri
| Malta
|-
| Mariner of the Mountains
| O Marinheiro das Montanhas
| Karim Aïnouz
| Brazil, France, Germany
|-
| colspan="2"|Memoria
| Apichatpong Weerasethakul
| Colombia, Thailand, France, Germany, Mexico, Qatar
|-
| colspan="2"|Memory Box
| Joana Hadjithomas and Khalil Joreige
| France, Lebanon, Canada, Qatar
|-
| colspan="2"|Minamata
| Andrew Levitas
| United States
|-
| Mr Bachmann and His Class
| Herr Bachmann und seine Klasse| Maria Speth
| Germany
|-
|colspan="2"|Nadia, Butterfly| Pascal Plante
| France
|-
| colspan="2"|Nemesis| Thomas Imbach
| Switzerland
|-
| colspan="2"|The Nest| Sean Durkin
| United Kingdom, Canada
|-
| Oasis| Oaza| Ivan Ikić
| Serbia, Slovenia, Netherlands, France, Bosnia and Herzegovina
|-
| colspan="2"|Olga| Elie Grappe
| Switzerland, Ukraine, France
|-
| Onoda: 10,000 Nights in the Jungle| Onoda| Arthur Harari
| France, Japan, Germany, Belgium, Italy, Cambodia
|-
| The Painted Bird| Nabarvené ptáče| Václav Marhoul
| Czech Republic, Slovakia, Ukraine
|-
| Paris, 13th District| Les Olympiades| Jacques Audiard
| France
|-
| colspan="2"|Petite Maman| Céline Sciamma
| France
|-
| colspan="2"|El Planeta| Amalia Ulman
| Spain
|-
| colspan="2"|Pleasure| Ninja Thyberg
| Sweden, Netherlands, France
|-
| Prayers for the Stolen| Noche de Fuego| Tatiana Huezo
| Mexico, Germany, Brazil, Qatar
|-
| colspan="2"|Quo Vadis, Aida?| Jasmila Žbanić
| Bosnia and Herzegovina, Austria, Romania, Netherlands, Germany, Poland, France, Norway, Turkey
|-
| colspan="2"|Roadrunner: A Film About Anthony Bourdain| Morgan Neville
| United States
|-
| The Sea Ahead| Albahr 'amamakum| Ely Dagher
| France, Lebanon, Belgium, United States, Qatar
|-
| colspan="2"|The Sparks Brothers| Edgar Wright
| United Kingdom, United States
|-
| colspan="2"|Stop-Zemlia| Kateryna Gornostai
| Ukraine
|-
| colspan="2"|Sweat| Magnus von Horn
| Poland, Sweden
|-
| The Tale of King Crab| Re Granchio| Alessio Rigo de Righi, Matteo Zoppis
| Italy, Argentina, France
|-
| colspan="2"|Tina| T. J. Martin, Daniel Lindsay
| United States
|-
| The Tsugua Diaries| Diários de Otsoga| Maureen Fazendeiro, Miguel Gomes
| Portugal, France
|-
| colspan="2"|Vortex| Gaspar Noé
| France, Belgium, Monaco
|-
| We| Nous| Alice Diop
| France
|-
| What Do We See When We Look at the Sky?| Ras vkhedavt, rodesac cas vukurebt?| Alexandre Koberidze
| Germany, Georgia
|-
| Wheel of Fortune and Fantasy| Gûzen to sôzô| Ryusuke Hamaguchi
| Japan
|-
| colspan="2"|Women Do Cry| Mina Mileva, Vesela Kazakova
| Bulgaria, France
|-
| The Worst Person in the World| Verdens værste menneske| Joachim Trier
| Norway, France, Sweden, Denmark
|-
| colspan="2"|Zanka Contact| Ismaël El Iraki
| Morocco, France, Belgium
|}

Imagina

People Next Door

Midnight Screenings

Awards
The following awards were presented at the 55th edition:

Official selection awards
Grand Prix – Crystal GlobeAs Far as I Can Walk by Stefan Arsenijević

Special Jury PrizeEvery Single Minute by Erika Hníková

Best Director
Dietrich Brüggemann for NöBest Actress
Éléonore Loiselle for WarsBest Actor
Ibrahim Koma for As Far as I Can WalkSpecial Jury MentionThe Staffroom by Sonja Tarokić
Vinette Robinson for her performance in Boiling PointJelena Stanković for cinematography in As Far as I Can WalkOther statutory awards
East of the West Grand PrixNuucha by Vladimir Munkuev

East of the West Special Jury PrizeSisterhood by Dina Duma

East of the West Special Jury MentionIntensive Life Unit by Adéla Komrzý

Právo Audience AwardZátopek by David Ondříček

Crystal Globe for Outstanding Artistic Contribution to World Cinema
Michael Caine (Great Britain)

Festival President's Award for Contribution to Czech Cinematography
Jan Svěrák (Czech Republic)

Festival President's Award
Ethan Hawke (United States)

Non-statutory awards
Award of International Film Critics (FIPRESCI)The Exam by Shawkat Amin Korki

The Ecumenical Jury AwardAs Far as I Can Walk by Stefan Arsenijević

Ecumenical Jury CommendationThe Staffroom by Sonja Tarokić

FEDEORA AwardOtar's Death by Ioseb "Soso" Bliadze

FEDEORA Jury Special MentionIntensive Life Unit by Adéla Komrzý

Europa Cinemas Label AwardAs Far as I Can Walk'' by Stefan Arsenijević

References

Karlovy Vary International Film Festival
Karlovy Vary International Film Festival
Karlovy Vary International Film Festival